NZI Bank Ltd v Euro-National Corp Ltd [1992] 3 NZLR 528 is a cited case in New Zealand regarding whether a contract illegal under law, can be subsequently validated under the Illegal Contracts Act 1970.

Background
The employees of Euro-National devised a complicated scheme to purchase Euro-National shares that were financed by Euro-National.

But the time under section 62(1) of the Companies Act [1955] made it illegal for a company to financially assist in the purchase of its own shares (since repealed), although there were numerous exceptions, such as financing share purchases of employees.

Whilst the Act deemed such a transaction "illegal" under the law, the Act did not expressly exclude validation as relief.

As a result, NZI sought validation of the transaction in question.

Decision
As the object of section 62(1) was to protect the interests of the shareholders and creditors of Euro-National, the court refused to grant validation. Richardson J stated "The deficiencies of the present arrangement cannot be categorized as procedural  or technical. They go to the heart of the proviso".

Footnote: This case is often contrasted with Catley v Herbert, where a similar transaction that also contravened section 62(1) was validated

References

New Zealand contract case law
1992 in New Zealand law
Court of Appeal of New Zealand cases
1992 in case law